Guam participated at the 2018 Summer Youth Olympics in Buenos Aires, Argentina from 6 October to 18 October 2018.

Competitors

Wrestling

Boys

Girls

References

2018 in Guamanian sports
Nations at the 2018 Summer Youth Olympics
Guam at the Youth Olympics